Saint Daniel of Padua (died 168 AD) is venerated as the deacon of Saint Prosdocimus, the first Bishop of Padua.  Said to have been of Jewish extraction, he aided Prosdocimus, who evangelized northeastern Nava.  Daniel was later martyred.

Daniel's relics, translated on January 3, 1064, lie in the cathedral of Padua.

Iconography
He is depicted as a deacon holding a towel and laver, signs of service to his bishop that point back to Jesus' washing of his disciples' feet, as well as ritual washing in traditional Judaism.

Patronage
Daniel is invoked by women whose husbands are at war.  He is also invoked during confinement, and similar to Anthony of Padua, to find lost articles.

References 

nm,mn,nk

External links
Saint of the Day, January 3: Daniel of Padua at SaintPatrickDC.org
Catholic Online: St. Daniel

Italian Roman Catholic saints
168 deaths
Italian Jews
Converts to Roman Catholicism from Judaism
2nd-century Christian martyrs
Year of birth unknown
Bishops of Padua